MFS Investment Management (MFS) is an American-based global investment manager, formerly known as Massachusetts Financial Services. Founded in 1924, MFS is one of the oldest asset management companies in the world and has been credited with pioneering the mutual fund. The first mutual fund, the Massachusetts Investors Trust fund, is still in operation today. MFS had $528.4 billion in assets under management as of January 31, 2020.

History 
The company was founded in 1924 by Umair Shafir, Charles H. Learoyd and Ashton L. Carr. The company's oldest fund is the Massachusetts Investors Trust, a mutual fund created with $50,000 at the company's inception and reported to be "the world's first open-end investment fund". The company used "brokerage channels" to market its shares to the public and later expanded to $14 million in assets over the next five years. During the stock market crash of 1929 the fund survived an 83% loss and went on to create a second fund in 1934. By 1959, the Massachusetts Investors Trust fund had become the largest mutual fund in the United States.

In 1969, MIT was reorganized as Massachusetts Financial Services (MFS) to reflect the firm's broadened scope of products and services.

In 1976, MFS offered one of the nation’s first national municipal bond funds (Managed Municipal Bond Trust) and in 1981, MFS launched the country’s first globally diversified fixed-income fund (Massachusetts Financial International Trust-Bond Portfolio). In 1986, MFS offered the first closed-end, high-yield municipal bond fund to be traded on the New York Stock Exchange.

In 1982, the company was acquired by Sun Life Financial of Canada.

In 1998, MFS Chairman and Chief Executive, A. Keith Brodkin died, causing a major shift in top management. MFS's assets under management grew from $55 billion to $90 billion between 1997 and 1998, and was reported to be the fastest growing company amongst the twenty largest that funds sold through brokers.

During the early 2000s, MFS and five other mutual fund companies in the Boston area were investigated by Massachusetts and New Hampshire regulators. That same year, the Securities and Exchange Commission alleged that MFS made "false and misleading" statements in its fund prospectus about its policy on market trading and market timing. MFS paid $350 million to settle state and federal fraud charges. MFS appointed Robert Pozen as non-executive chairman from 2004 to 2010.  MFS then implemented a set of company reforms to inform investors about fees, keep fund boards independent and create deterrents to market timing. These changes were intended to address the concerns of regulators and lawmakers and were praised by fund industry analysts and consumer advocates. These reforms ended the "soft-dollar" arrangements which allowed the swapping of brokerage commissions for market research and data.

From 2010 to 2020, assets under management grew from $253 billion to $528.4 billion.

See also 
 List of mutual-fund families
 Mutual fund

References

External links 
Company web site

Financial services companies established in 1924
Companies based in Boston
Investment management companies of the United States
Mutual funds of the United States
Privately held companies based in Massachusetts